Enikő Eszenyi (born 11 January 1961) is a Hungarian actress and theater director, recipient of Kossuth Prize (2001). She appeared in 1991's Paths of Death and Angels.

Selected filmography
 Night Rehearsal (1983)
 Eldorado (1988)
 The Pregnant Papa (1989)
 Paths of Death and Angels (1991)
 Kontroll (2003)

References

External links

1961 births
Living people
People from Csenger
Hungarian film actresses
20th-century Hungarian actresses